Shenergy Group Company Limited is a state-owned enterprise owned by Shanghai government in China. It is the parent company of Shenergy Company Limited, the listed company in the Shanghai Stock Exchange. It is engaged in the investments of electricity, petroleum and natural gas in Shanghai and Eastern China regions.

Its major subsidiary Shenergy Company Limited was reorganized from Shenneng Electric Power Company in 1992. It is engaged in the investments of electricity, petroleum and natural gas. It was listed on the Shanghai Stock Exchange in 1993, and it is the first Chinese electricity energy company listed in Shanghai.  It invests in Shanghai Waigaoqiao Electric Power Generating Company Limited and Wujing Thermal Power Plant with Shanghai Electric. It also involves in energy saving and environmental protection.

References

External links

Shenergy Group Company Limited

Oil companies of China
Natural gas companies of China
Electric power companies of China
Companies owned by the provincial government of China
Companies based in Shanghai
Energy companies established in 1996
Non-renewable resource companies established in 1996
1996 establishments in China

zh:申能集團